Embedded or embedding (alternatively imbedded or imbedding) may refer to:

Science 
 Embedding, in mathematics, one instance of some mathematical object contained within another instance
 Graph embedding
 Embedded generation, a distributed generation of energy, also known as decentralized generation
 Self-embedding, in psychology, an activity in which one pushes items into one's own flesh in order to feel pain
 Embedding, in biology, a part of sample preparation for microscopes

Computing 
 Embedded system, a special-purpose system in which the computer is completely encapsulated by the device it controls
 Embedding, installing media into a text document to form a compound document
 , a HyperText Markup Language (HTML) element that inserts a non-standard object into the HTML document
 Web embed, an element of a host web page that is substantially independent of the host page
 Font embedding, inclusion of font files inside an electronic document
 Word embedding, a text representation technique used in natural language processing
 Data representations generated through feature learning

Linguistics 
 Embedded clause or dependent clause: one that provides a sentence element with additional information, but which cannot stand alone as a sentence
 Center embedding, recursive nesting of an element in the middle of a similar element

Art 
 Embedded journalism, under the control of one side's army in a military conflict
 Embedded (play), a 2003 play by Tim Robbins about embedded journalists covering military conflict in the US-Iraq war
 Embedded (Mark Seymour album), 2004
 Embedded (Meathook Seed album), 1993
 "Embedded", a song by Job for a Cowboy from the 2007 album Genesis
 Embed Series, works by artist Mark Jenkins
 Embedded, a novel by Dan Abnett
 Embedded (film), a 2016 erotic political thriller film